The red cornetfish (Fistularia petimba), also known as the rough flutemouth, is a cornetfish of the family Fistulariidae, found in subtropical and tropical oceans worldwide, at depths between  and .

Range 
Fistularia petimba is widespread in warmer parts of the Atlantic Ocean and Indo-Pacific, including the waters of Australia and Hawaii. It has also been recorded on rare occasions in the Mediterranean Sea.  The species mostly lives in subtropical regions. In tropical areas, it tends to occur deeper or in places with cold upwellings.

Biology
This species is a crepuscular, stealthy predator which stalks its prey by moving slowly towards shoals of small fish, using its slender form to hide, and when it is close enough to its prey it darts forward and sucks it into its mouth.

References

 Tony Ayling & Geoffrey Cox, Collins Guide to the Sea Fishes of New Zealand,  (William Collins Publishers Ltd, Auckland, New Zealand 1982) 

Fistulariidae
Taxa named by Bernard Germain de Lacépède
Fish described in 1803